Cicindela arenaria is a species of ground beetle native to the Palearctic. In Europe, it is found in Albania, Austria, Belarus, Belgium, Bosnia and Herzegovina, Bulgaria, Croatia, the Czech Republic, European Turkey, mainland France, Germany, mainland Greece, Hungary, mainland Italy, Lithuania, Luxembourg, Moldova, North Macedonia, Poland, Romania, central and southern Russia, Sicily, Slovakia, Slovenia, Switzerland, Ukraine, and Yugoslavia.

References

External links

arenaria
Beetles described in 1775
Taxa named by Johann Kaspar Füssli
Beetles of Europe